Isques is a commune in the Pas-de-Calais department in the Hauts-de-France region of France.

Geography
The river Liane flows through the commune.

Population

Places of interest
 The church of St. Apolline, dating from the sixteenth century.
 The eighteenth-century chateau d'Hermerangues.
 A sixteenth-century castle on a motte.
 The sixteenth-century chateau de Quehen.
 The eighteenth-century chateau de Pont-de-Briques.

See also
Communes of the Pas-de-Calais department

References

External links

 Official website of the commune 

Communes of Pas-de-Calais